Min-kyu, also spelled Min-gyu, is a Korean masculine given name. It was the eighth-most popular name for baby boys in South Korea in 1990. Its meaning differs based on the hanja used to write each syllable of the name. There are 27 hanja with the reading "min" and 20 hanja with the reading "kyu" on the South Korean government's official list of hanja which may be registered for use in given names.

People with this name include:

Entertainers
 Brian Joo (Korean name Joo Min-kyoo, born 1981), Korean American R&B singer, member of Fly to the Sky
 Yoo Min-kyu (born 1987), South Korean actor
 Kim Min-gue (born 1994), South Korean actor
 Kim Min-kyu (entertainer) (born 2001), South Korean actor, singer, MC and model

Sportspeople
 Kim Min-gyu (table tennis) (1977–2017), South Korean para table tennis player
 Kim Min-kyu (judoka) (born 1982), South Korean judoka
 Kim Min-kyu (luger) (born 1983), South Korean luger
 Cho Min-gyu (born 1988), South Korean golfer
 Lee Min-kyu (born 1989), South Korean football defender
 Joo Min-kyu (born 1990), South Korean football striker and midfielder
 Kim Min-kyu (fencer) (born 1990), South Korean fencer
 Song Min-kyu (born 1990), South Korean tennis player
 Choi Min-kyu (born 1992), South Korean sprint canoer
 Lee Min-gyu (born 1992), South Korean volleyball player
 Cha Min-kyu (born 1993), South Korean speed skater
 Park Min-gyu (footballer) (born 1995), South Korean football defender
 Jang Min-gyu (born 1999), South Korean football defender in Japan
 Kim Min-gyu (baseball) (born 1999), South Korean baseball pitcher
 Song Min-kyu (footballer) (born 1999), South Korean football forward
 Kim Min-kyu (golfer) (born 2001), South Korean golfer

Others
 Park Min-gyu (born 1968), South Korean writer

References

See also 
 Mingyu

Korean masculine given names